Maximus of Constantinople may refer to:

 Archbishop Maximus I of Constantinople, Archbishop of Constantinople in 380
 Patriarch Maximus II of Constantinople (died 1216), Ecumenical Patriarch of Constantinople in 1216
 Patriarch Maximus III of Constantinople, Ecumenical Patriarch of Constantinople in 1476–1481
 Patriarch Maximus IV of Constantinople, Ecumenical Patriarch of Constantinople in 1491–1497
 Patriarch Maximus V of Constantinople (1897–1972), Ecumenical Patriarch of Constantinople in 1946–1948
 Maximus the Confessor (c. 580–662), Byzantine official, monk and theologian